Leave Alone the Empty Spaces is a solo album by John Bramwell. On 10 November 2017, it was pre-released  via Internet as a limited, signed edition together with the live album Live 2016. Back then it was available only in the physical form - as a vinyl and a compact disc. The customers were given a free digital download - a song called "Days Go By". On 2 February 2018, the album was made available to buy in the form of digital download and (in the physical form) in  regular stores.

Track listing 
 track lengths according to iTunes

Singles 
 "Who is Anybody?" (digital, 24 November 2017)
 "From the Shore" (digital?, 12 January 2018)
The fans of John Bramwell had a chance to appear in the video for "Who Is Anybody?" by entering an online video competition. The competition started on 19 October 2017 and "some winners" (sic!) were announced on 10 November 2017.

References 

2017 albums
2018 albums
John Bramwell albums